Kish (historically known as Qeys) is a  resort island in Bandar Lengeh County, Hormozgan Province, off the southern coast of Iran in the Persian Gulf. Owing to its free trade zone status, the island is touted as a consumer's paradise, with numerous malls, shopping centers, tourist attractions, and resort hotels. It has an estimated population of almost 40,000 residents and about 1 million visitors annually.

Kish Island is one of the most-visited vacation destinations in the Middle East, after Dubai and Sharm el-Sheikh. Tourists from many countries for which Iran typically requires a visa, who wish to enter Kish Free Zone, are exempt from having to obtain a visa. For those travelers, travel permits are issued on arrival by Kish officials and are valid for 14 days.

History 

Kish Island has been mentioned in history variously as Kamtina, Arakia, Arakata, and Ghiss.
Kish Island's strategic geographic location served as a way-station and link for the ancient Assyrian and Elamite civilizations when their sailboats navigated from Susa through the Karun River into the Persian Gulf along the southern coastline, passing Kish, Qeshm, and Hormoz islands. When these civilizations vanished, Kish Island's advantageous position was lost and for a period it was subjected to turmoil and the tyranny of local potentates and other vendors. With the establishment of the Achaemenid dynasty, the Persian Gulf was profoundly affected. Kish was, in particular, economically and politically linked with the civilization of the Medes and Persians when they were at the height of their power.

In the shadow of the empire, the islands in the Gulf became prosperous, navigation in the Persian Gulf was expanded, and better vessels were used to carry passengers and goods. Navigational aids, including lighthouses, were set up to facilitate navigation in the Persian Gulf.

In 325 BC, Alexander the Great commissioned Nearchus to set off on an expeditionary voyage to the Sea of Oman and the Persian Gulf. Nearchus's writings on Arakata contain the first known mention of Kish Island in antiquity. When Marco Polo visited the Imperial court in China, he commented on the Emperor's wife's pearls; he was told that they were from Kish.

Throughout much of its history, it was ruled by Arab merchants, when it was known as Qeys.

In the 1970s, Mohammad Reza Pahlavi, the last Shah of Iran, turned the island into a luxury resort for the international elite and a tourism hotspot, complete with a Grand Casino (renamed as the Shayan International Hotel after the Iranian Revolution). Kish Airport was designed to handle the Concorde. After the Islamic Revolution, Kish Island became a duty-free shopping center.

In March 2007, the retired FBI agent turned private eye Robert A. Levinson disappeared on Kish Island where he was meeting with an American fugitive known as Dawud Salahuddin. In 2019, the singer Joss Stone was deported from the island by the Iranian customs. Iranian officials claimed the British singer did not have the proper documentation to enter the country, but Joss Stone claimed the Iranian authorities were afraid a woman singer would perform a public show in the country.

Geography 

Along Kish's coast are coral reefs and many other small islands. The island's surface is flat, lacking mountains or even high hills. Its highest surface inclination extends from the airport to the shores near Shayan hotel.

Climate, nature, and geobotany
Kish, like the other Persian Gulf Islands, especially the islands in the Strait of Hormuz, is located on a narrow strip of tropical vegetation in the Northern Hemisphere, with the Persian plateau to the north and the Arabian Peninsula to the south. In addition to its special geographic and climatic attributes, Kish, like other nearby islands, such as Forur, Hendurabi, Shatuar, and Lavan, and even Qeshm, is under the sway of the semi-equatorial climate dominating this band of vegetation.

Weather
Kish has a very dry semi-equatorial climate. The relative atmospheric humidity in Kish makes it like a sea island except in cold seasons. The humidity is approximately 60% for most of the year. The statistical data in the Kish free zone's archives shows that the island's temperature varies from very hot to moderately hot, accompanied by relatively high humidity, often interspersed by heavy rains of short durations in certain seasons. With the exception of some southeastern coastal areas and a few other islands in the Persian Gulf, Kish Island has the most sunny hours in the region, roughly 3,100 hours per year. Based on climatological classification and general weather conditions, Kish's proximity to the Tropic of Cancer and its exposure to high tropical pressure systems, as well as its position amidst hot and shallow waters, means the island tends to be hot and humid most of the year.

Tourist attractions

Though Kish is a small island, it has numerous tourist attractions.

 

The Greek Ship is the wreck of a 1943 cargo steamship, the Koula F, on a beach on Kish's southwest coast. She was originally a British ship, Empire Trumpet, and was built in Scotland. In 1966, she ran aground and all attempts to salvage her failed. When Koula Fs crew abandoned her, they set her on fire, and all that remains is her steel hull.

Another attraction is the ancient underground aqueduct, also called the 'Underground City', which is partly open for tourists. It was built about 1,000 years ago for transportation and water supply across the different parts of the island.

Other attractions include the beaches, which have a bluish tint, and the long shoreline that sees many tourists visit during the winter season. The water is so clear that fish can be seen swimming in the sea all year long.

 Coral beach of the Island
 Greek Ship
 Traditional Cistern
 Kish recreational great Pier
 Birds Garden
 Kariz Underground City
 Dolphin Park
 Aquarium
 Harireh Old City
 Kish Safari
 Water and Beach sports
 Qanat and old Bathroom
 Ocean Water Park

Economy 

Since the mid-1990s, the Iranian government has embarked on an aggressive promotional and developmental campaign to position Kish as a rival to Dubai and to Doha. The campaign has included massive construction projects and programs designed to attract foreign investment and trade. Within the area of the Kish Free Zone, as it is known, the standard laws of the Islamic Republic of Iran are far more relaxed than on the mainland. This has resulted in significant increases in mostly domestic tourism, as well as the abundance of international trade on the island. Kish's population includes significant numbers of both Muslims and Christians. In 2009, the total foreign trade of the Kish Free Zone was approximately $9.2 billion per annum. Fifteen percent of all imports to Iran are through Kish.

Investment incentives in the Kish free trade zone include:
 15 years tax-exemption;
 no entry visa requirement;
 100% foreign ownership possible;
 flexible monetary & banking services;
 extended legal guarantees & protection.

Besides the existing Iranian Oil Bourse, a new exchange, the Kish Stock Exchange was inaugurated in 2010 to facilitate foreign investment and monetary activities.

Education 

Sharif University of Technology-International Campus-Kish was established in 1995. Kish International Campus, University of Tehran was established in 2007.

The importance of public education from the lowest to the highest levels as a main element in the steady development of Kish is now being paid special attention. Some of the most important activities include supporting and expanding existing educational centres, creating new educational centres, using new technology in developing educational activities, exploiting creditable national and international educational experiences, creating the foundations for all social classes to benefit from educational possibilities, developing applied sciences regionally, and promoting university education levels through holding courses with creditable universities at home and abroad.

To promote the quality and quantity of education, KFZO, the Kish Free Zone Organization, has created educational spaces by building new schools and giving priority to technical and vocational courses. These facilities have been located so as to make them easily accessible, especially for the local population. They include:

 Kish Institute of Arts and Sciences (teaching foreign languages);
 Kish Institute of Graph-Rayaneh (teaching computing);
 Parto Institute (teaching English);
 Sadaf Cultural Centre;
 Mir Mohana Cultural Centre;
 Sana'ei Cultural Centre; and
 Kish Institute of Science and Technology.

In 2005, Kish had over 4658 square metres of educational space, a 40% increase compared to the beginning of 2001. With this as well as the better living conditions of families in Kish, the number of students at each level is on the increase.

Transportation 

The connection with Kish is carried out either by sea or by air through Kish airport and Kish port.
Kish International Airport serves as the entry point for the hundreds of thousands of tourists who come to Kish Island. The airport grants 14-day visa-free entry foreign citizens who enter from a foreign country under a different scheme from that of mainland Iran.

Sports 

Kish Island hosts numerous international sporting events, including the Fajr International Squash Championship, which is part of the Professional Squash Association's annual tour.

Kish also holds Iran's Traditional and Heroic Games Contests, annually attracting over 17 countries worldwide. As part of the Flower of the East project, Kish will have an 18-hole championship golf course based on PGA standards and a 9-hole course for beginners.

Kish is home to a multi-purpose Olympic stadium seating 1,200 spectators which caters for 11 sports, including volleyball, basketball, handball, futsal, gymnastics, wrestling, taekwondo, judo, karate and chess. All of these are supervised by professional and international coaches.

The island attracts top national football teams and clubs who often use Kish as a summer training camp, taking advantage of its high quality facilities, good weather and tranquil environment. The island itself has a professional football team, Kish Air FC, which plays in the Hormozgan Provincial League.

The Kish Karting Track is one of the largest in Southwest Asia and one of the first of its kind in Iran.

A great array of water sports are also offered in Kish, including snorkeling and scuba diving, jet skiing, water skiing, parasailing, windsurfing, and fishing, as well as sailing and cruising on jet boats, sea skiffs, pedal boats, and banana boats, among many kinds of watercraft. Recently, Ocean Water Park, the first Iranian-themed and outdoor water park, was officially opened at Kish Island; it offers 14 water rides, four swimming pools, and other attractions.

Kish Island has three international standard volleyball courts and hosted the 2006 Asian Beach Volleyball Championship.

Kish was host to an officially sanctioned FIVB beach volleyball event, the Kish Island Open 2016, which ran from February 15 to 17. Qualification rounds at the 2017 FIVB Beach Volleyball World Tour event took place on Kish from 15 to 18 February.

Major Kish Island projects

International Oil Bourse
The International Oil Bourse is a commodity exchange which opened on February 17, 2008.

Ocean Water Park

Ocean Water Park is a  water park. It is the first Iranian themed water park and outdoor water park located at Kish Island. It was opened in January 2017 and currently has 13 rides, four swimming pools and a spa in addition to numerous restaurants, non-alcoholic bars, coffee shops, and shopping areas.

Kish Hidden Pearl
In 1999, a project to build an underground complex was begun by 300 artists and excavation workers. After deep excavations, rigid coral ceilings were discovered. These were incorporated into the final design. Once completed, the project will include restaurants, tourist resorts, and underground therapeutic mud pools.

Kish Dolphin Park
The Dolphin Park is a  park located at the southeast corner of Kish Island. It is surrounded by over 22,000 palm trees and includes a dolphinarium, butterfly garden, silkworm compound, bird garden, artificial rain forest, volcanic mountain, orchid garden, and cactus garden. The dolphinarium includes the largest man-made pool on the island and it exhibits dolphins, sea lions, and white whales.

The Bird Garden in the park is home to more than 57 species of birds and other animals from around the world, including pelicans, ostriches, blue-and-yellow macaws, storks, toco toucans, turacos, swans, African penguins, and marsh crocodiles.

Kish Aquarium
The Art Center on the island includes an aquarium that displays marine species unique to the Persian Gulf.

Gallery

Twin towns – sister cities
  Langkawi, Malaysia (since 2009)
  Dubai, United Arab Emirates (since 2002)

See also 

 Bandar Lengeh
 Chabahar free trade-industrial zone, another free trade zone in Iran
 Economy of Iran
 Flower of the East, a proposed luxury hotel development on Kish Island
 Foreign Direct Investment in Iran
 Iran airshow, a semi-regular international airshow held on Kish Island
 Kish Air, a domestic airline serving Kish Island

Notes

External links 

 Iran Free Zones official website
 Kish Free Zone Organization
 Iran's Official Universal Tourism Portal
 Information and Pictures of Kish (in Persian)
 Hamid-Reza Hosseini, Findings of Kish in Persian
 More pictures of Kish Island

Arab settlements in Hormozgan Province
Bandar Lengeh County
Islands of Iran
Islands of the Persian Gulf
 
Landforms of Hormozgan Province
Special economic zones
Tourist attractions in Hormozgan Province
Tourist attractions in Iran